Damiano is a fantasy novel by R. A. MacAvoy published in 1984.

Plot summary
Damiano is a novel in which the lute-playing alchemist Damiano goes on a quest to bring peace to his war-torn home town.

Reception
Dave Langford reviewed Damiano for White Dwarf #66, and stated that "MacAvoy has a neat touch with small magics and period detail, and writes with charm - which could be a problem for her if, as some reviewers of the sequels have suggested, it slips into saccharine and disneyfication. I hope not."

Colin Greenland reviewed Damiano for Imagine magazine, and stated that "a mild, reflective kind of fantasy, disrupted by the incidents of extreme violence the reluctant wizard has to cause and confront. R A MacAvoy's lucid, attractive writing has won her much popularity in American. It would be good to see her do well here too."

Reviews
Review by Faren Miller (1983) in Locus, #275 December 1983
Review [French] by Élisabeth Vonarburg (1984) in Solaris, #54
Review by Don D'Ammassa (1984) in Science Fiction Chronicle, January 1984
Review by Baird Searles (1984) in Isaac Asimov's Science Fiction Magazine, April 1984
Review by Tom Easton (1984) in Analog Science Fiction/Science Fact, April 1984
Review by Lynn F. Williams (1984) in Fantasy Review, June 1984
Review by Roger C. Schlobin (1984) in Fantasy Review, July 1984
Review by Mike Christie (1984) in Foundation, #32 November 1984

References

1984 American novels